Appendiculella is a genus of fungi in the family Meliolaceae. About 70 species are accepted in 2020.

Species
As accepted by Species Fungorum;

 Appendiculella acaenae 
 Appendiculella alchorneae 
 Appendiculella alpina 
 Appendiculella altingiae 
 Appendiculella anacardii 
 Appendiculella araliae 
 Appendiculella araucariae 
 Appendiculella arisanensis 
 Appendiculella austrocedri 
 Appendiculella buxi 
 Appendiculella calophylli 
 Appendiculella calostroma 
 Appendiculella camerunensis 
 Appendiculella castanopsidifoliae 
 Appendiculella chiriquiensis 
 Appendiculella compositarum 
 Appendiculella cornu-caprae 
 Appendiculella cunninghamiae 
 Appendiculella dombeyae 
 Appendiculella echinata 
 Appendiculella echinus 
 Appendiculella elaeocarpi 
 Appendiculella elaeocarpicola 
 Appendiculella engelhardiae 
 Appendiculella erythropali 
 Appendiculella eupatorii 
 Appendiculella fitzroyae 
 Appendiculella gaultheriae 
 Appendiculella himalayana 
 Appendiculella hoveniae 
 Appendiculella illicii 
 Appendiculella kalalauensis 
 Appendiculella kiraiensis 
 Appendiculella konishii 
 Appendiculella labiatarum 
 Appendiculella larviformis 
 Appendiculella lithocarpicola 
 Appendiculella lonicerae 
 Appendiculella lozanellae 
 Appendiculella malaisiae 
 Appendiculella malloti 
 Appendiculella mauensis 
 Appendiculella megalongensis 
 Appendiculella micheliicola 
 Appendiculella monsterae 
 Appendiculella musyaensis 
 Appendiculella natalensis 
 Appendiculella neolitseae 
 Appendiculella nepalensis 
 Appendiculella photiniicola 
 Appendiculella pilgerodendri 
 Appendiculella pyracanthae 
 Appendiculella quercina 
 Appendiculella rimbachii 
 Appendiculella rubi 
 Appendiculella sapindi 
 Appendiculella shettyi 
 Appendiculella sinsuiensis 
 Appendiculella sororcula 
 Appendiculella speciosa 
 Appendiculella splendens 
 Appendiculella stachyuri 
 Appendiculella stranvaesiicola 
 Appendiculella styracicola 
 Appendiculella tonkinensis 
 Appendiculella tuberculata 
 Appendiculella turpiniae 
 Appendiculella uapacicola 
 Appendiculella vaccinii 
 Appendiculella vacciniorum 
 Appendiculella viticis 
 Appendiculella vivekananthanii 
 Appendiculella wendlandiae 
 Appendiculella wuyiensis 

Former species (all Meliolaceae family);
 A. adelphica  = Asteridiella adelphica 
 A. arecibensis  = Appendiculella larviformis
 A. calophylli var. apetali  = Appendiculella calophylli
 A. compositarum var. portoricensis  = Appendiculella sororcula
 A. doliocarpi  = Asteridiella doliocarpi
 A. echinus var. domingensis  = Appendiculella echinus
 A. gloriosa  = Appendiculella natalensis
 A. larviformis var. major  = Appendiculella larviformis
 A. natalensis var. ugandensis  = Appendiculella natalensis
 A. natalensis var. ugandensis  = Appendiculella natalensis
 A. perrottetiae  = Amazonia perrottetiae
 A. pinicola  = Asteridiella pinicola
 A. sororcula var. portoricensis  = Appendiculella sororcula
 A. styracicola var. minor  = Appendiculella styracicola
 A. tonkinensis var. cecropiae  = Appendiculella tonkinensis
 A. ugandensis  = Asteridiella ugandensis,
 A. vernoniae  = Appendiculella sororcula

References

Fungal plant pathogens and diseases
Sordariomycetes genera
Meliolaceae
Taxa named by Franz Xaver Rudolf von Höhnel
Taxa described in 1919